Horní Blatná is a town in Karlovy Vary District in the Karlovy Vary Region of the Czech Republic. It has about 400 inhabitants. The town centre is well preserved and is protected by law as urban monument zone.

History
The settlement of the area was closely connected with tin mining, the origins of which date back to the end of the 15th century. Horní Blatná was founded as a mining town in 1532. In 1548, it was promoted to a royal mining town by Emperor Ferdinand I and obtained various privileges.

The economic situation of the town was bolstered by opening of the railway line Karlovy Vary–Johanngeorgenstadt in 1899.

According to the census of 1921, the town had the population of 2,163. 2,090 were Germans, 14 Czechoslovaks and 58 foreigners. Vast majority of the inhabitants were Roman Catholics, complemented by 62 Protestants and two people without religion.

From 1938 to 1945 it was one of the municipalities in Sudetenland. After World War II, the town was returned to Czechoslovakia and the local German population expelled.

References

External links

Cities and towns in the Czech Republic
Populated places in Karlovy Vary District
Towns in the Ore Mountains